The Starčevo–Karanovo I-II–Körös culture or Starčevo–Körös–Criș culture is a grouping of two related Neolithic archaeological cultures in Southeastern Europe:  the Starčevo culture and the Körös or Criș culture.

Settlements 
Some of the earliest settlements of the Starčevo–Körös–Criș culture were discovered in the Banat Plain and southwest Transylvania. Culture sites were also discovered in the north-west Balkans, which yielded painted pottery noted for its "barbotine" vessel surfaces. Specifically, the Starčevo settlements were located in Serbia, Körös in Hungary, and Criș in Romania.

Characteristics 

The Starčevo culture is an archaeological culture of Southeastern Europe, in what is now Serbia, dating to the Neolithic period between c. 5500 and 4500 BCE (according to other source, between 6200 and 5200 BCE). The Starčevo culture is sometimes grouped together and sometimes not.

The Körös culture is another Neolithic archaeological culture, but in Central Europe. It was named after the river Körös in eastern Hungary and western Romania, where it is named Criș. It survived from about 5800 to 5300 BC.

Gallery

References

Sources

Further reading
Biagi, P. and Spataro, M., 2005. New observations on the radiocarbon chronology of the Starčevo-Criș and Körös cultures. Prehistoric Archaeology & Anthropological Theory and Education. Reports of Prehistoric Research Projects, pp. 6–7.
Kertész, R., Sümegi, P. 2001. Theories, critiques and a model: Why did the expansion of the Körös–Starcevo culture stop in the centre of the Carpathian Basin. Kertész, R.–Makkay, J. eds. From the Mesolithic to the Neolithic. Archaeolingua Press, Budapest, pp. 225–246.
KOZŁOWSKI, J.K. and RACZKY, P., 2010 (eds.). Neolithization of the Carpathian Basin: Northernmost distribution of the Starčevo/Körös culture. Polska Akademia Umiejetnosci, Kraków.
Ursulescu, N., 2001. Local variants of the Starčevo-Criș culture in the Carpato-Nistrean area. Festschrift für Gh. Lazarovici. Timișoara: Muzeul Banatului, pp. 59–67.
El Susi, G., 2008. The comparative analyze of faunal samples from Sites dated in Starčevo-Körös-Criș Culture–phases IB-IIA from Transylvania and Banat.
Spataro, M., 2004. Differences and similarities in the pottery production of the Early Neolithic Starcevo-Criș and Impressed Ware Cultures. Rivista di Scienze Preistoriche, 57, pp. 321–336.
Letica, Z., 1971. Starčevo and Körös culture at Vinča. Archaeologia Iugoslavica IX, pp. 11–18.
Jongsma, T.L., 1997. Distinguishing pits from pit houses: an analysis of architecture from the Early Neolithic central Balkan Starčevo-Criș culture through the analyses of daub distribution. Unpublished MA thesis, University of Manitoba, Department of Anthropology.
Beldiman, C. and Sztancs, D.M., 2013. The osseous artefacts of the Starčevo-Criș culture in Romania. An overview. In Facets of the Past. The Challenge of the Balkan Neo-Eneolithic. Proceedings of the International Symposium Celebrating the 85th Birth Anniversary of Eugen Comșa, 6–12 October 2008 (pp. 106–133). Editura Academiei Române București.
Beldiman, C. and Diana-Maria, S., 2011. Technology of Skeletal Materials of the Starčevo-Criș Culture in Romania. The First Neolithic Sites in Central/South-East European Transect, 2, pp. 57–70.

 
6th-millennium BC establishments
5th-millennium BC disestablishments
Archaeological cultures of Southeastern Europe
Former disambiguation pages converted to set index articles
Neolithic cultures of Europe